Olena Pazderska (born 4 January 1984) is a Ukrainian curler.

Teams and events

Mixed doubles

Personal life
Olena Pazderska and her mixed doubles teammate Yevhen Stadnyk live and curl in New Jersey, United States.

She graduated from Cornell University in 2009.

References

External links

Olena Pazderska, Information Technology and Services

1984 births
Living people
People from New Jersey
Ukrainian female curlers
American female curlers
Cornell University alumni
21st-century American women